Cîteaux Abbey is a Catholic abbey located in Saint-Nicolas-lès-Cîteaux, south of Dijon, France. It is notable for being the original house of the Cistercian order. Today, it belongs to the Trappists (also called the Cistercians of the Strict Observance).

The abbey has about 35 members. The monks produce a cheese branded under the abbey's name, as well as caramels and honey-based candies.

History 
Cîteaux Abbey was founded on Saint Benedict's Day, 21 March 1098, by a group of monks from Molesme Abbey seeking to follow more closely the Rule of St. Benedict. The Abbey was supported by Renaud, Vicomte de Beaune, and Odo I, Duke of Burgundy. They were led by Saint Robert of Molesme, who became the first abbot. The site was wooded and swampy, in a sparsely populated area. The toponym predates the abbey, but its origin is uncertain. Theories include a derivation from cis tertium [lapidem miliarium], "this side of the third [milestone]" of the Roman road connecting Langres and  Chalons sur Saône, or alternatively from cisternae "cisterns", which in Middle Latin could refer to stagnant pools of a swamp.

The monastery produced the illuminated manuscript now known as the Cîteaux Moralia in Job in the year 1111.

The second abbot was Saint Alberic, and the third abbot Saint Stephen Harding, who wrote the Carta Caritatis that described the organisation of the order. Saint Bernard of Clairvaux, who would later be proclaimed Doctor of the Church, was a monk of Cîteaux Abbey and left it in 1115 to found Clairvaux Abbey, of which he was the first abbot. Saint Bernard would also be influential in the subsequent rapid growth of the Cistercian order.

The great church of Cîteaux Abbey, begun in around 1140, was completed in 1193. The Dukes of Burgundy subsequently used it as their dynastic place of burial.

By the beginning of the 13th century the order had more than 500 houses. Cîteaux was then an important center of Christianity. In 1244, King Louis IX of France (Saint Louis) and his mother Blanche of Castile visited the abbey.

During the Hundred Years' War, the monastery was pillaged in 1360 (when the monks sought refuge in Dijon), 1365, 1434 and 1438. In 1380, the Earl of Buckingham stayed at L'Aumône Abbey, a daughter house of Cîteaux located in the forest of Marchenoir whilst his army was quartered in the surrounding Forest.

In the beginning of the 16th century, the abbey was a strong community of about 200 members. The abbey was badly hit by the French Wars of Religion. The abbey then slowly declined for the next century. In 1698, the abbey only had 72 professed monks. In 1791, during the French Revolution, the abbey was seized and sold by the government.

In 1898, the remains of the abbey were bought back and repopulated by Trappists.

List of abbots

References

Sources
 Plouvier, M. and Saint-Denis, A. (eds.), 1998: Pour une histoire monumentale de Cîteaux, 1098-1998 (Commentarii cistercienses. Studia et documenta, 8), Cîteaux.

External links

 Official site

Pictures
 Photo
 Abbey Stamp
 Illumination of an Abbey Manuscript

Religious buildings and structures completed in 1193
Cistercian monasteries in France
Trappist monasteries in France
Buildings and structures in Côte-d'Or
1098 establishments in Europe
1090s establishments in France
Christian monasteries established in the 11th century